The Love Expert is a surviving 1920 American silent romantic comedy film directed by David Kirkland and produced by and starring Constance Talmadge. It was an early distribution release by the First National Exhibitor's Company.

Plot
As described in a film magazine, Babs (Constance Talmadge) is sent home from boarding school because she persists in carrying out her fanciful love researches instead of studying her lessons. Continuing these experiments at home, her father, the influential and stern John Hardcastle (Lucy), punishes her by sending Babs to stay with Aunt Cornelia (Spaulding) in Boston instead of taking her to Palm Beach. However, in Boston Babs finds fertile ground for her experiments. Aunt Cornelia has been for six years engaged to Jim Winthrop (Halliday), but a wedding seems remote as Jim has two unmarried sisters and an elderly aunt to look after. Something has to be done, so Babs sends a fake telegram which results in her going to Palm Beach accompanied by her troupe of Bostonians, much to the amazement of her father. Romance after romance follows in the wake of her experiments. Then comes the news that Aunt Cornelia, who was left behind in Boston, has married a college professor. That news does not break Jim's heart, for the "love expert" uses one of her unfailing remedies.

Cast

Preservation
A print of The Love Expert is preserved in the Library of Congress collection and the British Film Institute National Film and Television Archive.

References

External links

1920 films
American silent feature films
First National Pictures films
American black-and-white films
American romantic comedy films
1920 romantic comedy films
Surviving American silent films
1920s American films
Silent romantic comedy films
Silent American comedy films